Ampullaceana balthica is a species of gastropods belonging to the family Lymnaeidae.

The species is found in Eurasia.

References

Lymnaeidae
Gastropods of Asia
Gastropods of Europe
Gastropods described in 1758
Taxa named by Carl Linnaeus